Connor Taras is a Canadian sport kayaker from Waverley, Nova Scotia, who was a silver medalist with the Canadian Men's K-4 1000 metres team at the 2011 Pan American Games. He also competed in the Men's K-1 200 metres, finishing sixth.

Education and career 
Taras was educated at Mount Saint Vincent University, studying marketing.

He tried out for the Canadian kayaking team for the 2012 Summer Olympics, but missed qualifying by 0.6 seconds. After struggling with his sexual orientation for a number of years, Taras began coming out as gay to friends and family in 2013. According to Taras, the freedom to be open about his sexual orientation made him a better athlete; in the same year, he successfully shaved a full 12 seconds off his personal best time.

In 2015, Taras announced his retirement from competitive sport. He served as coordinator of ceremonies for the 2015 Pan American Games in Toronto, Ontario, and is an ambassador for the Canadian Olympic Committee's OneTeam initiative to combat homophobia in sports.

References

Canadian male canoeists
Canadian LGBT sportspeople
Gay sportsmen
Canoeists at the 2011 Pan American Games
Sportspeople from Nova Scotia
People from the Halifax Regional Municipality
Living people
Mount Saint Vincent University alumni
Pan American Games medalists in canoeing
Pan American Games silver medalists for Canada
Year of birth missing (living people)
LGBT canoeists
Medalists at the 2011 Pan American Games
21st-century Canadian LGBT people
Canadian gay men